Distancias is the fifth album from Puerto Rican folk singer Roy Brown. The album was released by Disco Libre in 1977. It is composed of songs based on poems from Juan Antonio Corretjer.

Recording
Distancias was recorded at Tony Croatto's home studio in Caimito, San Juan from April to June 1976. The album consists of seven songs, all of them based on poems from Juan Antonio Corretjer, including a second version of "En la vida todo es ir". The album also features contributions from José González and Miguel Cubano.

Track listing

Cultural impact 
Roy Brown's adaptations of Corretjer poems have become very popular in Puerto Rico. Some of the songs have been covered by other artists. "En la vida todo es ir" was recorded by Spanish singer Joan Manuel Serrat, and "Oubao Moin" was covered by Puerto Rican rock group Sol D'Menta on their eponymous debut album.

Notes 

1977 albums
Roy Brown (Puerto Rican musician) albums